7-ACA (7-aminocephalosporanic acid) is the core chemical structure (a synthon) for the synthesis of cephalosporin antibiotics and intermediates. It can be obtained by chemoenzymatic hydrolysis of cephalosporin C.

See also
 6-APA

References 

Cephalosporin antibiotics
Acetate esters
Sulfur heterocycles